Karbach is an Ortsgemeinde – a municipality belonging to a Verbandsgemeinde, a kind of collective municipality – in the Rhein-Hunsrück-Kreis (district) in Rhineland-Palatinate, Germany. It belongs to the Verbandsgemeinde Hunsrück-Mittelrhein, whose seat is in Emmelshausen.

Geography

Location
The municipality lies in the Hunsrück some 4 km east of Emmelshausen and 7 km west of Sankt Goar, the town on the Rhine. It is linked to the national road network by the Autobahn A 61 (Emmelshausen interchange) and Bundesstraße 327, also called the Hunsrückhöhenstraße (“Hunsrück Heights Road”, a scenic road across the Hunsrück built originally as a military road on Hermann Göring’s orders). Karbach's area is 498 ha and its elevation is 500 m above sea level.

Land use
Over the last 25 years or so, the share of the municipality's land given over to agriculture has fallen from roughly 50% to 42%, while the share of wooded land has risen from 40% to more than 46%.

History
In 1109, Karbach had its first documentary mention of sorts when the Quintenach estate, which lay within what are now Karbach's municipal limits, was mentioned along with another estate named Hirzenach in a document from Pope Paschal II when he donated them to the Siegburg Abbey with the proviso that a monastery be built there. The donation was confirmed the following year, and Hirzenach Monastery was duly built. By 1256, the Vogtei rights over Hirzenach, Karbach and Quintenach had come to be held by the Elector of the Palatinate. The Lords of Ehrenburg were then in turn enfeoffed with the territory, which they held until 1666, when their rightful successors, the Barons of Clodt, took over, themselves holding it until 1803. Beginning in 1794, Karbach lay under French rule. In 1815 it was assigned to the Kingdom of Prussia at the Congress of Vienna. Since 1946, it has been part of the then newly founded state of Rhineland-Palatinate.

Population development
Figures from 1871 on come from censuses:

Politics

Municipal council
The council is made up of 12 council members, who were elected by majority vote at the municipal election held on 7 June 2009, and the honorary mayor as chairman.

Mayor
Karbach's mayor is Michael Bender.

Coat of arms
The German blazon reads: Das Wappen zeigt ein gespaltenes Schild: vorn in Blau einen goldenen Schräglinksbalken, hinten in Silber St. Quintin in goldenem Panzerhemd und rotem Mantel, in der Rechten einen grünen Palmwedel, in der Linken einen Bratspieß haltend.

The municipality's arms might in English heraldic language be described thus: Per pale azure a bend Or and argent Saint Quentin in a chainmail shirt of the second and a mantle gules holding in his dexter hand a palmleaf vert and in his sinister a skewer.

The German blazon leaves certain information out that nonetheless manifests itself in the resulting arms, namely the speckles on the bend (diagonal stripe) and the tinctures of the skewer and Saint Quentin himself.

Karbach formerly belonged to the Lordship of Ehrenburg, and those lords’ arms can be seen on the dexter (armsbearer's right, viewer's left) side in Karbach's arms. The charge on the sinister (armsbearer's left, viewer's right) side is Saint Quentin, the municipality's patron saint, and he is depicted here, as in the local Saint Quentin's Chapel, holding a palmleaf and a skewer.

Culture and sightseeing

Buildings
The following are listed buildings or sites in Rhineland-Palatinate’s Directory of Cultural Monuments:
 Saint Anne’s Catholic Chapel (Kapelle St. Anna), St.-Quintin-Straße 9 – aisleless church, 1770, expansion 1923
 St.-Quintin-Straße 3 – timber-frame Quereinhaus (a combination residential and commercial house divided for these two purposes down the middle, perpendicularly to the street), partly solid, earlt 18th century
 Saint Quentin’s (former) Parish Church (Pfarrkirche St. Quintin), southwest of the village – aisleless church, essentially mediaeval, interior remodelled in  Baroque, 1748; whole complex of buildings with graveyard (see also below)

Saint Quentin’s
The former parish church, Saint Quentin’s, from the 12th century on a pilgrimage destination, by reason of its original building goes back to the 10th century, as indeed do the village of Karbach and the Quintenach estate. Although it was destroyed in the Thirty Years' War, it was built up again beginning in 1749 and consecrated anew in 1751. The one-naved church with its quire enclosed on three sides houses a wooden altar from 1275 with an image of Our Lady of Sorrows (Pietà), presumably from the Franciscan monastery at Oberwesel, and a wooden statue of Saint Quentin from the 14th century. Quire windows from 1899, 1909 and 1960, the last time the church underwent a thorough renovation, with images of the namesake saint as well as appearances by the Mother of God give the church’s inner space its light.

Clubs
 Kultur- carnival society (und Karnevalsverein e.V. culture and Carnival)
 Mandolinen- und Blasorchester Rheinhöhe 1932 Karbach e. V. (mandolin and wind orchestra)
 Fußballclub „Blau-Weiß“ Karbach e. V. (football)
 Jugend Club Karbach (JCK) (youth)
 VfB Fanclub Rheinwacht'' (VfB Stuttgart fanclub)

Economy and infrastructure
Because agricultural operations have generally grown in size, the number of such businesses locally has fallen from 20 to 5. Karbach has also developed into a tourism community and today offers the many hikers the infrastructure that they seek. A few small retailers and service-sector businesses offer the needed services; anything further must be sought in nearby Emmelshausen.

Education
The Catholic community maintains a kindergarten in the municipality.

References

External links
 Municipality’s official webpage 

Municipalities in Rhineland-Palatinate
Rhein-Hunsrück-Kreis